Sámal Johansen (born 31 October 1899 in Haldórsvík, Faroe Islands, died 11 March 1991) was a Faroese writer and teacher. He was the father of Marita Petersen, the first female prime minister of the Faroe Islands.

In the years 1928 - 1931, Sámal Johansen was editor, together with Samuel Jacob Sesanus Olsen, of the children's magazine Barnablaðið.

Johansen received the Faroese Literature Prize, also known as M.A. Jacobsens Heiðursløn in Faroese, in 1975 for the book 'Á bygd fyrst í tjúgundu øld'.

Published 
 1950 Hylurin in Mín jólabók 
 1957 Jólaaftanskvøld in Mín jólabók
 1961 Tvey systkin in Mín jólabók
 1970 Á bygd fyrst í 20. øld (book)
 1972 Heimbygdin og aðrar søgur (book, the title means: My hometown and other stories)
 1980 Til lands in Mín jólabók ("Mín jólabók" means "My Christmas book". It contains short stories, poems etc. and is published every year shortly before Christmas in November/December by "Bókadeild Føroya Lærarafelags", the publishing house of the Faroese Teachers' Association.)

References

1899 births
Year of death missing
Faroese literature
Faroese writers
Faroese short story writers
Faroese Literature Prize recipients
Danish male short story writers